Here is a breakdown of the Scheduled Caste population by district in Uttar Pradesh:

References

Uttar Pradesh-related lists

 
Uttar Pradesh